Satya Deo Singh (27 February 1945 – 17 December 2020) was an Indian politician.

Career
Satya Deo Singh started his political career with Jansangh. He was first elected to Lok Sabha in 1977. As Jansangh morphed into Bhartiya Janata Party, he became National President of Bhartiya Janata Yuva Morcha in 1980. He was reelected to Lok Sabha in 1991 and 1996.

Death
He died from a cardiac arrest and COVID-19 during the COVID-19 pandemic in India.

References

1945 births
2020 deaths
Lok Sabha members from Uttar Pradesh
People from Gonda, Uttar Pradesh
India MPs 1991–1996
India MPs 1996–1997
Bharatiya Jana Sangh politicians
Bharatiya Janata Party politicians from Uttar Pradesh
Deaths from the COVID-19 pandemic in India